Katie Loynes (born 23 March 1986) is a retired Australian rules footballer who played for Carlton and Greater Western Sydney in the AFL Women's (AFLW) competition.

AFLW career
Loynes was drafted by Carlton with the club's fourteenth selection and the one hundred and tenth overall in the 2016 AFL Women's draft. She made her debut in Round 1, 2017, in the club and the league's inaugural match at Ikon Park against . At the end of the 2018 season, she was the joint winner of the club best and fairest alongside Breann Moody. Loynes was delisted by Carlton at the conclusion of the 2021 season. A few weeks later it was announced that she joined Greater Western Sydney. In April 2022, Loynes retired after 45 AFLW games.

Personal life
She is a teacher at Mordialloc College, a Secondary School in Melbourne's South-East. She teaches Physical Education and Health and Human Development.

References

External links

Living people
1986 births
Carlton Football Club (AFLW) players
Australian rules footballers from Victoria (Australia)
Sportswomen from Victoria (Australia)
Victorian Women's Football League players
Greater Western Sydney Giants (AFLW) players